Frank Bacon may refer to:

 Frank Bacon (actor) (1864–1922), American character actor and playwright
 Frank Bacon (football manager) (1862–1917), director and temporary manager of Bristol City F.C.
 Frank L. Bacon (1841–1917), member of the Wisconsin State Assembly
 Francis Bacon (American football), known as Frank, NFL player in the early 1920s

See also
 Francis Bacon (disambiguation)